Kolfage may refer to:

 Brian Kolfage (born 1982), veteran of the United States Air Force
 Kolfage Island, an Ontarian island in Lake Huron